Streptomyces polyantibioticus is a bacterium species from the genus of Streptomyces which has been isolated from soil from a riverbank from the Umgeni River from the KwaZulu-Natal Province in South Africa.

See also 
 List of Streptomyces species

References

Further reading

External links
Type strain of Streptomyces polyantibioticus at BacDive -  the Bacterial Diversity Metadatabase

polyantibioticus
Bacteria described in 2009